N32 may refer to:

Roads 
 N32 road (Belgium), a National Road in Belgium
 N32 road (Ireland)
 Nebraska Highway 32, in the United States

Other uses 
 N32 (Long Island bus)
 Northrop N-32, an American transport aircraft
 Thule Site N-32, a former Army Air Defense Command Post